Krios may refer to:

People and figures
Crius, a figure in Ancient Greek mythology
Krio people, an ethnic group in Sierra Leone
Vangelis Krios (born 1973) Greek soccer player

Places
Krios (star), the star HD 240429, which is in a wide binary system with star HD 240430
Aries (constellation), also sometimes called Krios
Krios (stream), a stream in Aigeira, Achaea, Greece
Krios, Evros, Thrace, Greece; a village
Krios, a fictional planet first mentioned in the 1992 Star Trek episode "The Perfect Mate"

See also
 Krio (disambiguation)